Hassen Ben Nasser (born 16 December 1986) is a Tunisian racing cyclist. He rode at the 2013 UCI Road World Championships.

Major results

2005
 3rd Road race, National Road Championships
2006
 1st Overall Tour des Aéroports
1st Points classification
1st Young rider classification
1st Stages 5 & 8
 7th Overall Tour du Maroc
 10th Road race, African Road Championships
2007
 3rd Road race, National Road Championships
 3rd Overall Tour of Libya
 5th Grand Prix de la ville de Tunis
 7th Overall Tour des Aéroports
1st Stages 4 & 7
2008
 1st  Road race, National Road Championships
 2nd Overall Tour de la Pharmacie Centrale
1st Stages 6 & 7a
 5th Overall Tour of Libya
2009
 8th Overall Tour d'Egypte
 8th Grand Prix of Sharm el-Sheikh
2011
 3rd Road race, National Road Championships
2012
 National Road Championships
1st  Time trial
1st  Road race
2013
 3rd Time trial, National Road Championships
 6th Road race, African Road Championships
2014
 1st  Time trial, National Road Championships
2015
 3rd Time trial, National Road Championships
2016
 3rd Time trial, National Road Championships
 8th Overall Tour de Tunisie
2017
 National Road Championships
3rd Road race
3rd Time trial
 10th Overall Tour de Tunisie
2018
 3rd Road race, National Road Championships
2019
 National Road Championships
1st  Road race
2nd Time trial

References

External links

1986 births
Living people
Tunisian male cyclists
Place of birth missing (living people)
21st-century Tunisian people